Metodološki zvezki – Advances in Methodology and Statistics is a peer-reviewed academic journal covering methodology and statistics, published by the Faculty of Social Sciences of the University of Ljubljana.

Anuška Ferligoj and Andrej Mrvar were the founding editors-in-chief.

Abstracting and indexing
From 2011 to 2019 the journal was abstracted and indexed in Scopus.

See also
 List of academic journals published in Slovenia

References

External links

University of Ljubljana publications
Faculty of Social Sciences, Ljubljana
Mathematics journals
Statistics journals
Publications established in 2004
Academic journals of Slovenia
Multilingual journals
Academic journals published in Slovenia